Poli (also Romanized as Polī; also known as Pollow) is a village in Lalar and Katak Rural District, Chelo District, Andika County, Khuzestan Province, Iran. At the 2006 census, its population was 320, in 51 families.

References 

Populated places in Andika County